The Visakhapatnam City Police is the local law enforcement agency for the city of Visakhapatnam, Andhra Pradesh and is headed by the city police commissioner. Visakhpatnam City police are also informally called the Vizag City Police.

Organizational structure
The Visakhapatnam Police Commissionerate is headed by a commissioner of police and one joint commissioner of police there are 2 Divisions and 6 Sub-Divisions and each division consists of a Deputy commissioner of Police and Assistant Commissioner of Police with particular number of police stations.

Current Structure
Currently the Visakhapatnam City Police has 2 Divisions and 6 Sub Divisions.
 Visakhapatnam 1
 Visakhapatnam 2
Sub Divisions
 East Sub Division
 West Sub Division
 South Sub Division
 North Sub Division
 Harbour Sub Division
 Dwaraka Sub Division.

Command Control Centre
Visakhapatnam Police have a command Control Centre with this, the city police can monitor whole city.

References

Government agencies established in 1983
Government of Visakhapatnam
Andhra Pradesh Police
Metropolitan law enforcement agencies of India
1983 establishments in Andhra Pradesh